Who I Am And What I Want is a 7 minute animated short directed by Chris Shepherd and David Shrigley in 2005. The film is based on the 2003 David Shrigley book of the same title. Kevin Eldon voices the role of the film's main character, Pete. The DVD was released in 2006 with a 12-page booklet with art from the film.

Story
Pete lives in the woods. He survives by hunting and killing. He is an outcast from society who finds happiness in being alone. He recalls the key moments that led him to turn his back on his hometown. Pete is in a state of denial about the past, drinking, mental illness and what happens when he does not take his medication is all one big laugh to him.

History
This quirky funny black and white animation was commissioned in 2004 by the animate! project. On completion it was given an 18 certificate by the British Board of Film Classification, a result which David Shrigley said he was proud of. David Shrigley and Chris Shepherd talked for several years about making a film. David Shrigley's 2003 book of the same title had a story which featured a narrative, a fictional autobiography which they realised was a perfect basis for a film.

Who I am And What I Want was programmed alongside Farber's Nerve by Morgan Miller in the 2006 Manhattan Short Film Festival's world tour, which included 137 screenings across
the US, Canada, the UK, and Europe. Both animations were in black and white.

Quotes
Pete: "My name is mushroom. My name is toadstool. My name is spore. My name is fungus. My name is mildew. My name is bog, fen, marsh and swamp. My name is truffle. My name is bacteria. My name is muck...but you can call me Pete."

Pete: "Everyone around here knows me..."  Pete walks along the highstreet, he walks up to the bouncer of the Golden Nugget Bar.
Pete: "Morning" 
Bouncer: "Fuck Off!" 
Pete: "I'm not allowed in the Golden Nugget...Not anymore. I don't know why I'm not allowed in there. I can't remember having done anything".

Pete: "I want to feel you breathing upon me, and I want to be water-soluble so that when I go water skiing and fall off I will dissolve before the sharks can eat me".

Pete: "I don't want to live with a herd of twats who are going to make me wear clothes and eat with a knife and fork.".

Credits
Who I Am And What I Want, a film by Chris Shepherd and David Shrigley.
 Voice: Kevin Eldon
 Producer: Maria Manton
 Animation: Alan Andrews, Siren Halvorsen and Ellen Kleiven
 Additional Compositing: John Taylor
 Extras Editor: Rod Main
 Sound Design: Barnaby Templer and Jake Roberts
 Music: Martin Young

A Slinky Pictures Production. An animate! commission funded by Arts Council England and Channel 4.

References

External links
 Who I Am and What I Want official site
 Animate Projects: Who I Am and What I Want
 Animate Projects: Dad's Dead
 

British animated short films
2005 films
Fiction with unreliable narrators
2000s British films